Nalder is a surname of English origin. People with the surname include:

 Bill Nalder (born 1952), former Australian rules footballer
 Cambell Nalder (1937–1987), Australian politician, son of Crawford Nalder
 Crawford Nalder (1910–1994), Australian politician
 Dean Nalder (born 1966), Australian politician, grandson of Crawford Nalder
 Eric Nalder, American journalist
 Leonard Fielding Nalder (1888–1958), British colonial administrator
 Reggie Nalder (1907–1991),  actor
 Ron Nalder (born 1939), Australian rules footballer